In chess, decoying is the tactic of luring a piece, usually the king or queen, onto a particular square through the means of a sacrifice on that square, from which the piece's new placement can be exploited to obtain an advantage.

Example

In the diagram, with Black to play, illustrates two separate decoys. First, the white queen is set up on c4 for a knight fork: 1... Rxc4! 2. Qxc4. Next, the fork is executed by removing the sole defender of the a3-square: 2... Qxb2!+ 3. Rxb2 Na3+ 4. Kc1. Finally, a zwischenzug decoys the king to b2: 4... Bxb2+. After either 5.Kxb2 Nxc4+ 6.Kc3 Rxe4, or 5.Kd1 Nxc4, Black is two pawns ahead and should win comfortably.

Perhaps the most celebrated game featuring a decoy theme is Petrosian vs. Pachman, Bled 1961, which also involved a queen sacrifice.

See also
 Chess terminology

Notes

Chess tactics